The 2014 BWF World Championships was a badminton tournament which was held from 25 to 31 August 2014 at the Ballerup Super Arena in Copenhagen, Denmark.

Host city selection
Copenhagen and Macau submitted bids for this of championships. Both cities also bid for the 2013 edition, which was later won by Guangzhou. On 9 December 2011, Badminton World Federation decided to award the championships to Copenhagen during a meeting in Queenstown, New Zealand.

Draw
The draw was held on 11 August 2014 at the Berjaya Times Square in Kuala Lumpur, Malaysia.

Schedule
All five events started on the first day and concluded with the final on the last day.

All times are local (UTC+2).

Medalists

Medal table

References

 
2014
BWF World Championships
BWF World Championships
2014 BWF World Championships
2014 BWF World Championships
Badminton tournaments in Denmark
August 2014 sports events in Europe